Aurin (C.I. 43800), sometimes named rosolic acid or corallin is an organic compound, forming yellowish or deep-red crystals with greenish metallic luster. It is practically insoluble in water, freely soluble in alcohol. It is soluble in strong acids to form yellow solution, or in aqueous alkalis to form carmine red solutions.  Due to this behaviour it can be used as pH indicator with pH transition range 5.0 - 6.8. It is used as an intermediate in manufacturing of dyes.

Synthesis
Aurin was first prepared in 1834 by the German chemist Friedlieb Ferdinand Runge, who obtained it by distilling coal tar.  He named it Rosölsäure or Rosaölsäure (red oil acid).  In 1861, the German chemists Hermann Kolbe and Rudolf Schmitt presented the synthesis of aurin by heating oxalic acid and creosote (which contains phenol) in the presence of concentrated sulfuric acid.  (Gradually, chemists realized that commercial aurin was not a pure compound, but was actually a mixture of similar compounds.)

Aurin is formed by heating of phenol and oxalic acid in concentrated sulfuric acid.

Safety
Aurin may cause eye, skin, and respiratory tract irritation. Ingestion and inhalation should be avoided.

Aurin was reported to have endocrine disruptor chemical (EDC) properties.

References

External links
MSDS at Oxford University
History of aurin in Heinrich Caro and the creation of modern chemical industry

Triarylmethane dyes
PH indicators
Phenol dyes
Bis(4-hydroxyphenyl)methanes